Piedimulera is a comune (municipality) in the Province of Verbano-Cusio-Ossola in the Italian region Piedmont, located about  northeast of Turin and about  northwest of Verbania. Piedimulera is described as a village located on the left bank of the river Anza, at the foot of the mountain, called Mulera.

Piedimulera borders the following municipalities: Calasca-Castiglione, Pallanzeno, Pieve Vergonte, Vogogna, Seppiana.

References

Cities and towns in Piedmont